Kyle John Forti (1989 – March 3, 2019) was an American political consultant, active in Colorado.

Education 
In 2012, Forti graduated from Hillsdale College in Michigan with degrees in Political Science and Christian Studies.

Career 
In 2013, Forti founded and became president of Peak Political Solutions. In 2014, Forti was named by Red Alert Politics on a “30 Under 30” list of conservative rising stars. In 2015, Forti co-founded D/CO Consulting, a political and public relations firm based in Denver, Colorado. Forti had worked for and managed the campaigns of many Republican politicians in Colorado. Forti was described as a "prolific figure in Colorado Republican politics".

Personal life 
Kyle Foti was married to Hope Forti, who founded Foster Together Colorado in 2018, which is a nonprofit that supports foster families. He also had two children.

Death 
Forti died on March 3, 2019, in a helicopter crash in Kenya. The helicopter crashed shortly after takeoff from Central Island National Park near Lake Turkana. Four American tourists and the Kenyan pilot died.

References

1989 births
2019 deaths
American political consultants
American campaign managers
Victims of aviation accidents or incidents in 2019